Cheshmeh Kabud-e Chenar (also Romanized as Cheshmeh Kabūd-e Chenār) is a village in Jalalvand Rural District, Firuzabad District, Kermanshah County, Kermanshah Province, Iran. At the 2006 census, its population was 114, in 25 families.

References 

Populated places in Kermanshah County